Kate Shepherd (born in 1961) is an American artist based in New York City.

Education
Shepherd completed her B.A. from Oberlin College, Oberlin, Ohio, in 1982. She studied briefly at the Institute for Architecture and Urban Studies, New York in 1982, before dropping out to pursue individual artistic work. During this time, Shepherd earned a living painting portraits and making drawings for The New Yorker. She later completed her masters degree with a Master's Certificate, from New York Academy of Art, New York, in 1986. She later attended the Skowhegan School of Painting and Sculpture in 1990, and obtained an M.F.A. from the School of Visual Arts, New York in 1992.

Exhibitions 
Shepherd has had solo exhibitions at the Phillips Collection, Washington D.C.; Portland Institute for Contemporary Art, Portland, Oregon; Otis College of Art & Design, Los Angeles, California; the Lannan Foundation, Santa Fe, New Mexico; and the Chinati Foundation, Marfa, Texas.

Collections 
 Albright-Knox Art Gallery, Buffalo, New York
 Baltimore Museum of Art, Baltimore, Maryland
 Bibliothèque Nationale de France, Paris, France
 Des Moines Art Center, Des Moines, Iowa
 Detroit Institute of Arts, Detroit, Michigan
 Eli and Edythe Broad Art Museum, Michigan State University, East Lansing, Michigan
 Indianapolis Museum of Art, Indianapolis, Indiana
 List Visual Arts Center, Massachusetts Institute of Technology, Cambridge, Massachusetts
 Los Angeles County Museum of Art, Los Angeles, California
 The Menil Collection, Houston, Texas
 Metropolitan Museum of Art, New York, New York
 Museum of Fine Arts, Boston, Massachusetts
 New York Public Library, New York, New York
 Norton Museum of Art, West Palm Beach, Florida
 The Phillips Collection, Washington, D.C.
 Scottsdale Museum of Contemporary Art, Scottsdale, Arizona
 Seattle Art Museum Seattle, Washington

References

External links 

 Official website

1961 births
Living people
American women painters
20th-century American women artists
Abstract painters
American women printmakers
20th-century American printmakers
21st-century American women artists
Saint Ann's School (Brooklyn) alumni
Oberlin College alumni
Skowhegan School of Painting and Sculpture alumni
School of Visual Arts alumni